Wazoo (often known as the Wazoo bar) was a candy bar launched by Topps in 2009.
The bar was taffy with a creamy, tangy coating covered in sprinkles. The candy bar came in two flavors: "Blue Razz" and "Wild Berriez". It was invented by Dan Hart and his partner Gary Weiss and was pitched to Topps who began production. The company that was in charge of producing the Wazoo Bar shortly went bankrupt once they hit store shelves, making the bars that were distributed the only ones that were ever available.

References

External links
 
Products introduced in 2009
Brand name snack foods
Candy bars